The Senate Commerce Subcommittee on Space, Science, and Competitiveness is a subcommittee within the Senate Committee on Commerce, Science and Transportation. It was renamed from the Subcommittee on Space, Aeronautics, and Related Sciences at the start of the 111th Congress.

Jurisdiction
The Subcommittee's jurisdiction includes oversight of NASA, the National Science Foundation, the National Institute of Standards and Technology, and the Office of Science and Technology Policy. For the 111th Congress, the Subcommittee gained additional jurisdiction on science matters from the former United States Senate Commerce Subcommittee on Science, Technology, and Innovation.

Members, 118th Congress

Historical subcommittee rosters

117th Congress

115th Congress

See also
United States House Science Subcommittee on Space

References

External links
Which former U.S. presidential candidate is the chair of the Senate Commerce Subcommittee on Space, Science and Competitiveness?
Committee on Commerce, Science and Transportation website, Subcommittee page

Commerce Space